Global is an album by Trinidadian Ragga Soca artist Bunji Garlin released in 2007 by VP Records. The album is Garlin's first that he aimed at international audiences, with previous releases aimed only at the West Indies, and he explained "In order for the genre to grow, we have to put out music that people throughout all of the islands can feel, not just for Trinidad". The album features guest appearances by Chris Black (on "Swing It") and Freddie McGregor (on "One Family"). Allmusic's Rick Anderson called it "very nice overall", commenting that Garlin's vocals were "straight out of the dancehall -- more rapid-fire declamation than melodic calypso crooning".

Track listing
"No Super Hero"
"Pan and Soca"
"Brrt" (Marchout Riddim)
"Get Up Stand Up" - (featuring T.O.K.)
"Fire Fi Dem"
"Hardcore Lover" - (featuring Rita Jones)
"We Maniac"
"Globally"
"Raise Yuh Hand"
"Blaze It Up"
"Swing It" - (featuring Chris Black)
"One Family" - (featuring Freddie McGregor)
"Put in the Thing"
"Turn Me On"
"Hands Up"

References

2007 albums
Bunji Garlin albums